Andar Ab may refer to:
 Andar Ab, Ardabil
 Andar Ab, Razavi Khorasan